Alvis Lindel "Al" Veach (August 6, 1909 – September 6, 1990) was a Major League Baseball pitcher who made two starts in  for the Philadelphia Athletics. He batted and threw right-handed.

External links

1909 births
1990 deaths
People from Shelby County, Alabama
Major League Baseball pitchers
Baseball players from Alabama
Philadelphia Athletics players